Millerville is a census-designated place and unincorporated community in Clay County, Alabama, United States. Its population was 303 as of the 2020 census.

Demographics

References

Census-designated places in Clay County, Alabama
Census-designated places in Alabama